SS Omrah was an ocean liner for the Orient Steam Navigation Company built in 1899 for passenger service between the United Kingdom and Australia. During World War I, the ship was taken over for use as a troopship. On 12 May 1918, while headed from Marseilles to Alexandria, Omrah was torpedoed and sunk by German submarine   from Sardinia. One person aboard Omrah died in the attack.

References 
 
 

Ships built on the River Clyde
Steamships
Ships of the Orient Line
Passenger ships of the United Kingdom
Passenger ships of Australia
Troop ships of Australia
Ships sunk by German submarines in World War I
1898 ships